Craig T. Clemmensen is an American government official serving as Director of the United States Department of Housing and Urban Development's Departmental Enforcement Center. He was Acting Secretary of Housing and Urban Development from late January to early March 2017 during the transition of the Trump Administration. He is a member of the Republican Party. 

He has worked in the Department of Housing and Urban Development since 1998, initially as part of the management team that established the Departmental Enforcement Center. He moved to the Federal Housing Administration Office of Housing in 2002, and then returned to the Departmental Enforcement Center as its director in May 2010.  He holds a bachelor's degree from Rider University.

References 

Rider University alumni
Trump administration cabinet members
United States Secretaries of Housing and Urban Development
Living people
Year of birth missing (living people)